Hollywater is a small village in Hampshire, England. It lies two miles east to its nearest town, Bordon. The village is a crossing point to Whitehill to Liphook, and has the River Wey running through the village. The village itself is situated in the Woolmer Forest and has one Primary School.

External links
 Hollywater Primary School
 Hollywater School and village address details

Villages in Hampshire